Men's javelin throw events for athletes with cerebral palsy were held at the 2004 Summer Paralympics in the Athens Olympic Stadium. Events were held in three disability classes.

F35

The F35 event was won by Guo Wei, representing .

25 Sept. 2004, 17:00

F36/38

The F36/38 event was won by Nicholas Newman, representing .

23 Sept. 2004, 09:00

F37

The F37 event was won by Kenny Churchill, representing .

27 Sept. 2004, 17:00

References

M